Groupe Figaro is a French media conglomerate owned by Dassault Group. The company contains some of the core assets of the now extinguished Socpresse that Dassault purchased in 2006.  Dassault renamed its press holdings as "Groupe Figaro" in 2011.

Holdings
Groupe Figaro owns Le Figaro, Madame Figaro, TV Magazine, Le Figaro Histoire, Le Figaro Magazine, Figaro Golf, Figaro Santé, Figaro enchères, Figaro nautisme and Figaro Bourse.  As of 2016, its revenues were €520 million and it had 1,500 employees.

Groupe Figaro also owns CCM Benchmark Group, which owns L'Internaute, Le Journal des Femmes, and several other publications. In Brazil, it owns the Portuguese-language A Revista da Mulher.  In Italy, it owns the Magazine delle Donne.

Ownership
Its ownership by Serge Dassault was long a source of controversy in terms of conflict-of-interest, as Dassault also owned a major military supplier and served in political positions from the Union for a Popular Movement party. His son Olivier Dassault has been a member of the French National Assembly for 18 years, while at the same time holding several positions at Dassault Group and its subsidiaries, including its media subsidiaries. Serge Dassault remarked in an interview in 2004 on the public radio station France Inter that "newspapers must promulgate healthy ideas" and that "left-wing ideas are not healthy ideas."

References

Conglomerate companies of France
Newspaper companies of France
Conservatism in France
Dassault Group
Year of establishment missing
Magazine publishing companies of France